Porwanie Baltazara Gąbki was a Polish-language fantasy animated series produced by Studio Filmów Rysunkowych from 1969 to 1970, that was based on 1965 children's book Porwanie Baltazara Gąbki by Stanisław Pagaczewski. The series had 1 season consisting of 13 episodes, each lasting from 6 to 7 minutes. The episodes were directed by Władysław Nehrebecki, Alfred Ledwig, Edward Wątor, Józef Byrdy, Bronisław Zeman, Wacław Wajser, and Stanisław Dülz, while the scrips were written by Zofia Olak and Leszek Mech. The series were continued by Wyprawa profesora Gąbki, that was produced from 1978 to 1980.

Plot 
The famous biologist and explorer, Baltazar Gąbka, travels to the Raincoat Land (Polish: Kraina Deszczowców), in order to study the flying frogs. As he does not return to his country after a long time, Duke Krakus orders to organize the rescue expedition to find him, and bring him back. The expedition was joined by Wawel Dragon and Bartolini Bartłomiej of Zielona Pietruszka coat of arms, who was the royal chef. They travel from the city of Kraków to the Raincoat Land in their amphibious vehicle. The main characters are followed by Don Pedro de Pommidore, the spy from the Raincoat Land.

Episodes

Citations

Notes

References 

Polish children's animated television series
Animated television series about dragons
Children's animated fantasy television series
Polish fantasy television series
1969 television series debuts
1960s Polish television series debuts
1970 Polish television series endings
1960s animated television series
1970s animated television series
1960s Polish television series
1970s Polish television series
Television series based on children's books